Laren may refer to:

Places
 Laarne, municipality located in the Belgian province of East Flanders, earlier referenced as Laren

 Laren, Gelderland, village in the Dutch municipality of Lochem
 Laren, North Holland, municipality and town in the Netherlands

People
 Laren, a character from the Freddi Fish series
 Laren Sims (1966-2002), American criminal charged with first-degree murder in the death of her husband, California attorney Larry McNabney
 Laren Stover, American author
 Ro Laren, fictional character on the television series Star Trek: The Next Generation

See also
 McLaren (disambiguation), a racing team

English given names